is a science museum located in Ichikawa, Chiba Prefecture, Japan. The museum introduces mainly topics related to technology, for modern industry. The museum sets up its goal as to provide a place for experiencing various aspects of science and technology which is applied in industry to people at all ages.

History 
Originally the site of the museum was the location for nakayama factory of Japan Wool Textile. The site was reformed by constructing the museum and other facilities including Colton Plaza.

Organization 
The museum is operated by a board of 60 members presenting various organizations such as universities, companies, and foundations in Chiba prefecture.

Facilities 
 Experiment Theatre
 Science Stage
 Exhibition Hall
 Library

Access 
 15 minutes walk from Shimōsa-Nakayama Station on Chūō-Sōbu Line
 15 minutes walk from Motoyawata Station on Chūō-Sōbu Line
 13 minutes walk from Onigoe Station on Keisei Electric Railway
 20 minutes walk from Motoyawata Station on Toei Shinjuku Line

References

External links 

 Official Website  

Ichikawa, Chiba
Science museums in Japan
Museums in Chiba Prefecture
Museums established in 1994
1994 establishments in Japan